Roller sports competitions at the 2019 Pan American Games in Lima, Peru are scheduled to be held at the Polideportivo 3 (artistic), and Pista de Patinaje (speed skating).

The artistic competitions will start on July 26 and finish on the 27th. Speed skating competitions will take place on the 9th and 10 August.

In 2016, the International Olympic Committee (IOC) made several changes to its sports program, which were subsequently implemented for these games. Included in this was the addition of skateboarding events for the first time to the Pan American Games sports program.

In May 2019, Panam Sports announced that skateboarding was removed from the sports program because World Skate could not guarantee the best athletes competing. Panam Sports also cited a "lack of respect" because World Skate scheduled a World Tour event at the same time as the games and would not authorize the competition as an Olympic qualifier.

8 medal events are scheduled to be contested, two in artistic and six in speed skating. A total of 56 qualified to compete at the games.

Medal table

Medalists

Artistic skating

Speed skating

Qualification

A total of 56 roller sports athletes will qualify to compete. 16 will qualify in artistic and 40 in speed skating. The Pan American Championships for each discipline held in 2018 was used to determine the qualifiers.

References

External links
Results book – Artistic skating
Results book – Speed skating

 
Events at the 2019 Pan American Games
Pan American Games
2019